Tim Ward (born May 6, 1978) is a former top Australian professional vert skater. Ward won many competitions in his vert skating career.

Vert Competitions  
1999 Street IISS Comp, Canberra 1st
1999 Australian Championship First Place Vert
1997 X Games - Vert: 1st
1997 Lausanne Second Place Vert 
1997 X Games Vert Champion 
1997 X Games Second Place Street 
1997 Orlando X-Games Trials Second Place Street 
1997 Orlando X-Gaines Trials Third Place Vert 
1997 Australian Championship First Place Vert 
1997 Paris Hersey First Place Street 
1997 Paris Bersey Second Place Street 
1996 MSS Amsterdam Second Place Vert 
1996 BUSS Amsterdam Eight Place Street 
1996 Victorian Titles First Place Vert 
1995 Victorian Titles First Place Street 
1995 ASA Finals First Place Street 
1995 Australian Title Open Div, First Place Street 
1995 Australian Title Open Div. Second Place Vert 
1995 Extreme Games Thirteenth Place Vert 
1994 Australian Title Under 16 First Place

References

External links
rollerblading.com.au
emesce.com
skateparkoftampa.com
rollerblading.com.au
skatelog.com
skatelog.com
ziplink.net

Vert skaters
1978 births
Living people
X Games athletes
Sportspeople from Melbourne